Ellinochori (Greek: Ελληνοχώρι meaning Greek village; formerly Βουλγάρκιοϊ, Bulgarian village) is a village in the northeastern part of the Evros regional unit in Greece. Ellinochori is part of the municipality of Didymoteicho. It is situated on the left bank of the river Erythropotamos, northwest of the centre of Didymoteicho. In 2011 its population was 593 for the village and 1,373 for the community, including the villages Lagos and Thyrea.

Population

History

The village was founded by the Ottoman Turks and named after its mostly Bulgarian population. It was ceded to Bulgaria in 1915 along with the rest of the lower Evros (Maritsa) valley, but following the 1919 Treaty of Neuilly it became part of Greece. As a result its Bulgarian and Turkish population was exchanged with Greek refugees, mainly from today's Turkey.

People

Michalos Garoudis (b. 1940)
Panagiotis Goutzimisis (b. 1941)

See also
List of settlements in the Evros regional unit

External links
Zoni on GTP Travel Pages

References

Didymoteicho
Populated places in Evros (regional unit)